Camp Black Hawk may be:

Camp Black Hawk (Missouri)
Camp Black Hawk (Wisconsin)